Edward Wright (born 3 May 1945) is a former English cricketer.  Wright was a right-handed batsman who bowled left-arm fast-medium.  He was born in Shipdham, Norfolk.

Wright made his debut for Norfolk in the 1969 Minor Counties Championship against Cambridgeshire.  Wright played Minor counties cricket for Norfolk from 1969 to 1982, making 72 Minor Counties Championship appearances.  He made his only List A appearance in 1982 against Leicestershire in the NatWest Trophy.  He wasn't required to bat in the match, but did bowl 9 wicket-less overs for the cost of 19 runs.

References

External links
Edward Wright at ESPNcricinfo
Edward Wright at CricketArchive

1945 births
Living people
People from Shipdham
English cricketers
Norfolk cricketers
Sportspeople from Norfolk